A guillotine is a device for carrying out executions by decapitation.

Guillotine or Guillotines may also refer to:

Cutting
 Guillotine, a type of cigar cutter
 Guillotine amputation, performed without closure of the skin in an urgent setting – typically followed by a 2nd-phase amputation
 Guillotine cutting,  the process of partitioning a material by bisecting it
 Guillotine (metalwork) or shear
 Paper cutter or paper guillotine

Film
Guillotine (film), a 1924 German silent drama film
The Guillotines, a 2012 Chinese film

Music
"The Guillotine", a 2006 song by Escape The Fate
"Guillotine", a 2016 song by Jon Bellion
Guillotine (band), an Indian musical group
Guillotine (British India album) (2007)
Guillotine (Circle album) (2003)
"Guillotine" (Death Grips song), a 2011 song by Death Grips

Sports
Guillotine (wrestling) or the twister, a spinal lock
Guillotine choke, a martial arts chokehold
Guillotine, a press-up where the chest, head, and neck are lowered below the plane of the hands

Other uses
Guillotine (character), a character from Marvel Comics
Guillotine (game), a card game
Guillotine (magic trick)
Cloture or guillotine,  a motion or process in parliamentary procedure aimed at bringing debate to a quick end

See also
Flying guillotine, a Chinese premodern combat weapon